The Trend was a Marxist-Leninist political movement of the mid-1970s through the mid-1990s in the United States. It consisted of a loose collection of small communist organizations, newspapers, and theoretical groups that staked out a line that was intermediate between the Soviet-aligned Communist Party, USA and the Third-worldist-oriented, Maoist New Communist Movement. Groups that were part of The Trend include The Guardian newspaper (now defunct, not to be confused with The Guardian (UK)) and the associated Guardian Clubs, Line of March (later Frontline Political Organization), Crossroads, Organizing Committee for an Ideological Center, El Comite-MINP, and other groups.

Notes

References
Elbaum, Max.  Revolution in the Air: Sixties Radicals turn to Lenin, Mao and Che.  Verso, 2002.  
Ethan Young, "Family Tree: The Trend," Freedomroad.org, December 13, 2000.
Rick Rice Papers. circa 1960–1999. 2.44 cubic feet (2 cartons, 1 box).

Defunct American political movements
1970s establishments in the United States
1990s disestablishments in the United States